Spreckels may refer to:

Spreckels (surname)
Spreckels, California, originally a company town of the Spreckels Sugar Company
Spreckels Mansion, a mansion in Coronado, California, built for John D. Spreckels
Spreckels Mansion, a 1912 mansion built in San Francisco, California, built for Adolph B. Spreckels and Alma Spreckels
Spreckels Sugar Company, founded by Claus Spreckels
Spreckels Theater Building, built in San Diego, California in 1912

See also
Spreckels Lake, San Francisco, a man-made model boating facility in Golden Gate Park. 
Spreckels Organ, San Francisco, donated by Adolph B. Spreckels, at the California Palace of the Legion of Honor